The Star Observer is a free monthly magazine and online newspaper that caters to the lesbian, gay, bisexual, transgender and intersex communities in Australia. Since 20 June 2019 the Star Observer is owned by media company Out Publications.

History and readership
The newspaper was initially published by Michael Glynn as a tabloid in 1979 under the name The Sydney Star and is the oldest and largest publication of its kind in Australia. In 1982 the paper changed its name, becoming The Star (1982–1985), later undergoing several name changes, including Sydney's Star Observer (1986–1987), Sydney Star Observer (1987–2014; 2019 onwards) and Star Observer (2014-2019).

The typical profile of the audience is aged between 23 years and 50 years, with a higher than average income level. With a 2015 audited circulation in excess of 15,000 per month, the publishers at that time claimed a readership exceeding 41,000 readers in print and 100,000+ online.

In late 2013, Elias Jahshan was appointed editor; shortly afterwards, the publication ceased being a weekly newspaper and became a monthly magazine. Subsequent editors have included Corey Sinclair, Andrew M. Potts and Peter Hackney.

The current editors, as of January 2020, are Douglas Magaletti (print edition) and Shibu Thomas (digital). 

On 20 June 2019 it was reported that the Star Observer was saved from voluntary administration by media company Out Publications.

In mid-2019, Out Publications began a sister publication in Melbourne, the Melbourne Star Observer. Its contents are identical to the Sydney title except that local advertisements are inserted.

Format and content
In hardcopy tabloid format, The Star (as it is commonly known) is published on the third Thursday of each month and is distributed to numerous locations in Sydney and Melbourne. Copies can be found in cafés, libraries, cinemas, theatres, book shops, medical practices and community centres as well as gay and lesbian community outlets such as pubs, nightclubs, gay and lesbian friendly retail shops, gyms and sex on premises venues.

Both the tabloid publication and online version contain local, national, and international coverage related to gay and lesbian news, opinion and lifestyle. Non-specifically gay and lesbian items, such as arts and culture, real estate and technology are also covered. A strong focus of the publication is on community, such as sport, gay and lesbian business events, and opinion.

Each year special publications are produced to celebrate Sydney Gay and Lesbian Mardi Gras, Midsumma Festival and Mardi Gras Film Festival.

Community support
The shareholders of the publishing company have never drawn dividends from any profits generated by the Star Observer. Instead, the Star Observer has made donations to support the community through entities such as the AIDS Trust, Victorian AIDS Council, the Bobby Goldsmith Foundation and Twenty10 as well as others.

References

Further reading

External links
 Star Observer website
 Gay and Lesbian Australian Media Alliance website

1979 establishments in Australia
LGBT culture in Sydney
LGBT-related newspapers published in Australia
Defunct newspapers published in Sydney
Newspapers established in 1979
Free magazines
Publications disestablished in 2013
Magazines established in 2013
Monthly magazines published in Australia
Defunct weekly newspapers
Magazines published in Sydney
LGBT-related magazines published in Australia